Matthew Penn (born 1959) is an American director and producer of television and theatre. His father was a film and theatre director named  Arthur Penn, his mother actress Peggy Maurer.  He grew up in Stockbridge, Massachusetts, and New York City.  He has a double major in English and Theater, Matt graduated from Wesleyan University in 1980.

Prior to beginning work in television, Penn spent many years working as an actor and director in theatre and is currently co-artistic director of the Berkshire Playwrights Lab located in Great Barrington, Massachusetts.

Penn has directed and/or produced over 150 prime-time TV dramas. Some of his credits as a director include NYPD Blue, Law & Order, New York Undercover, Brooklyn South, The Sopranos, House, Damages, The Closer, and Royal Pains. He was nominated for an Emmy Award in 1999 for directing the 200th episode of Law & Order, guest-starring Julia Roberts. (Penn was also an executive producer of Law & Order from 2003 to 2007.)

References

External links

American television directors
American television producers
American theatre directors
American people of Russian-Jewish descent
Living people
Place of birth missing (living people)
Wesleyan University alumni
1959 births